The Road Canyon Formation is a geologic formation in Texas. It preserves fossils dating back to the Permian period.

Definition 
The formation is the defining unit for the Roadian stage of the Permian period.

See also 
 List of fossiliferous stratigraphic units in Texas
 Paleontology in Texas

References 

Geologic formations of Texas
Permian geology of Texas
 
Kungurian
Limestone formations
Reef deposits
Shallow marine deposits
Permian northern paleotropical deposits
Paleontology in Texas
Formations